Lysiane Gagnon is a Canadian journalist based in Quebec. She has written for Montreal's La Presse since 1980 and Toronto's Globe and Mail since 1990.

Gagnon was born in Montreal in 1941. From 1975 to 1980, she was a parliamentary correspondent. In 1975 she received the Olivar-Asselin Award, and has twice (in 1976 and 1982) been awarded the National Newspaper Awards prize. In 1984 she received the Salon de Montréal literary prize for her essay Vivre avec les hommes : un nouveau partage (Living with Men: A New Partnership). She has also published two collections of her columns, Chroniques politiques (Boreal, 1985) and L'esprit de contradiction (Boreal, 2010).

In her columns, Gagnon takes positions in regards to federalism and feminism. Some argue that she is a prominent defender of Israel (Of all Quebec's francophone columnists). She has written extensively about the need to protect the French language in Quebec and Canada.

References 

Living people
Canadian women journalists
Canadian columnists
The Globe and Mail columnists
Canadian women columnists
Journalists from Montreal
Canadian political journalists
Canadian women non-fiction writers
Writers from Montreal
Year of birth missing (living people)
Canadian social commentators